The Kings Arms Hotel is a public house and inn in the English village of Askrigg, North Yorkshire. A Grade II listed building, standing on the northern side of Main Street, it dates to 1767.

The inn was built by John Pratt, a local man who had made his fortune as a horse jockey at Newmarket Racecourse. John and Joseph Lodge purchased the pub in 1800.

All Creatures Great and Small
The pub doubled as Darrowby's Drover's Arms in the BBC television series All Creatures Great and Small (1978–1990). Photographs on its interior walls showed the cast drinking at the establishment during downtime.

The Drovers was made out to be located beside the church in the early series, as evidenced in the episode "The Name of the Game". "It was fun to design the Drovers, which later on they did on location in Askrigg," explained designer David Crozier. "But in the early days these scenes were all done at Pebble Mill."

Gallery

References

External links

Hotels in North Yorkshire
1767 establishments in England
Grade II listed pubs in North Yorkshire
Askrigg